Kenneth Shaun Draughn ( "drone"; born December 7, 1987) is a former American football running back. He played college football at the University of North Carolina. He signed with the Washington Redskins as an undrafted free agent in 2011. In his seven year career, Draughn played for seven different teams and spent a preseason with two others.

Early life
Draughn was born on December 7, 1987 in Tarboro, North Carolina to ministers Shirley and Kenneth Draughn. He attended Tarboro High School where he won three varsity letters in football as a quarterback, defensive back, linebacker, and running back. As a junior, he recorded 952 yards and 18 touchdowns. As a senior, he recorded 253 rushing attempts for 1,452 yards, and 21 touchdowns. Draughn received all-league honors and was named the Red Zone Player of the Week three times and the Eastern Plains Offensive Player of the Year. The Daily Sentinel and The Daily Southerner named him the player of the year, and the Rocky Mount Telegram named him the offensive player of the year. Rivals.com named him the 10th-ranked, SuperPrep named him the 12th-ranked, and The Charlotte Observer named him the 18th-ranked player in the state of North Carolina.

College career
Draughn sat out the 2006 season on redshirt status. He participated as a member of the defensive scout team. In 2007, Draughn played in 11 games, mostly on special teams. He saw action as a safety against James Madison and Virginia. He recorded five tackles, including two solo. In 2008, Draughn saw action in all 13 games as a tailback and recorded 198 carries for 866 yards and three touchdowns. He also made 16 receptions for 81 yards and one touchdown.

Professional career

Washington Redskins
Draughn signed with the Washington Redskins as an undrafted free agent on July 28, 2011, following the 2011 NFL Draft. He was cut on September 3 for final roster cuts before the beginning of the 2011 season.

Kansas City Chiefs
On October 5, 2011, Draughn was signed to the practice squad of the Kansas City Chiefs.
After being on the practice squad for 13 weeks, he was promoted to the active 53-man roster and was placed third on the running back depth chart on December 31, 2011, after Jackie Battle was placed on the injured reserve due to a foot injury sustained in the Chief's Christmas-day loss to the Oakland Raiders. Draughn played against the Denver Broncos in the season finale as a special teamer.

Before the 2012 season started, Draughn was listed third string.  During the final seconds of the season opener against the Atlanta Falcons, Draughn scored his first career touchdown while Kansas City lost 24-40.  He scored another touchdown on a six-yard carry during the Week 9 game against the San Diego Chargers. Draughn finished the season with 59 carries, 233 yards, and 2 rushing touchdowns.

Baltimore Ravens
While Draughn was again listed as the third of four running backs on the Kansas City Chiefs depth chart, the Chiefs released him before 53-man roster cuts in August. Draughn was then signed by the Baltimore Ravens on September 11, 2013. Draughn saw limited action with the Ravens appearing in only three games. On October 10, 2013 Draughn was released. In the 3 games he was active he recorded only 2 yards from 4 attempts.

Indianapolis Colts
The Colts announced on December 17, 2013, that they had placed linebacker Pat Angerer on season-ending injured reserve and had signed Draughn. On December 21, 2013, Draughn was waived by the Colts.

Chicago Bears
Draughn signed a one-year deal with the Chicago Bears on April 23, 2014.

San Diego Chargers
On September 23, 2014, Draughn signed a one-year deal with the San Diego Chargers. He was released on November 1, 2014.

Cleveland Browns
On December 3, 2014, Draughn signed with the Cleveland Browns. On March 6, 2015, the Browns re-signed Draughn to another contract. On September 5, 2015, he was waived by the Browns. On the following day, he cleared waivers and was signed to the Browns' practice squad. On September 12, 2015, Draughn was promoted to the active roster. He only played 5 games with the Browns. Rushing for only 2 attempts and a total of 10 yards rushing.

San Francisco 49ers
On November 2, 2015, Draughn signed with the San Francisco 49ers due to an injury to starter, Carlos Hyde. He was placed on injured reserve on December 30, 2015.

He was re-signed on March 2, 2016 to a one-year deal.  In Week 1 against the Los Angeles Rams, he stiff armed his way into the end zone. On October 23, against the Tampa Bay Buccaneers, he scored a long touchdown catch. On November 20, 2016, he scored a receiving touchdown against the New England Patriots. In the 2016 season, Draughn had 196 rushing yards with 4 rushing touchdowns. He also had 263 receiving yards and 2 receiving touchdowns.

New York Giants
On March 21, 2017, Draughn signed a one-year contract with the New York Giants. He was released on September 2, 2017.

Retirement
Draughn announced his retirement on November 24, 2018.

References

Further reading
Draughn running well for Tar Heels, Switch from defense to offense a good move, Charlotte Observer, September 5, 2008.
End zone eludes Draughn, but that's OK, News & Observer, November 21, 2008.
UNC's Draughn lightning at RB, News & Observer, August 18, 2008.
Heels' Draughn rooting against pal, News & Observer, November 13, 2008.
Draughn a big part of UNC's future, Rivals.com, August 11, 2007.
Up Close: Shaun Draughn, Part I, Scout.com, July 6, 2005.
Up Close: Shaun Draughn, Part II, Scout.com, July 11, 2005.
COLLEGE BOUND: Shaun Draughn, Rocky Mount Telegram, February 2, 2006.

External links
North Carolina Tar Heels bio
San Francisco 49ers bio
Cleveland Browns bio
Kansas City Chiefs bio

1987 births
Living people
American football return specialists
American football running backs
American football safeties
Baltimore Ravens players
Chicago Bears players
Cleveland Browns players
Indianapolis Colts players
Kansas City Chiefs players
New York Giants players
North Carolina Tar Heels football players
People from Tarboro, North Carolina
Players of American football from North Carolina
San Diego Chargers players
San Francisco 49ers players
Washington Redskins players